Waterloo Road is one of the principal north-south thoroughfares of Kowloon, Hong Kong. It stretches from Yau Ma Tei to Kowloon Tong.

Location
The road starts in the west at the intersection with Lai Cheung Road and Ferry Street, and runs east past Nathan Road. It then runs on a northeast-southwest alignment through the Yau Ma Tei and Ho Man Tin until the intersection with Princess Margaret Road and Argyle Street. The road then takes another turn and runs north through Kowloon Tong, leading towards the Lion Rock Tunnel.

History
Waterloo Road was named to commemorate the Battle of Waterloo. It was laid out in the early 20th century. The stretch of the road through Kowloon Tong was built in 1922 as part of the plans to develop the area. This portion of the road was designated as part of Hong Kong's Route 1 in 1974, and is the only part of Route 1 which features several intersections without grade separation.

Features
Kwong Wah Hospital, Wah Yan College, Kowloon, Maryknoll Convent School and True Light Girls' College are located on Waterloo Road in Yau Ma Tei. The wholesale Fruit Market and the Yau Ma Tei Theatre are located at the road's junction with Reclamation Street in Yau Ma Tei. Universal Models Limited is also situated on the Yau Ma Tei section.

The road intersects Argyle Street, a major street in Kowloon. Danger Flag Hill is a landmark located near the road.

The Yau Ma Tei station of MTR was initially named Waterloo station as it is at the junction of Waterloo Road and Nathan Road.

Literature
Waterloo Road features in the book Kowloon Tong: A Novel of Hong Kong by Paul Theroux.

See also
 List of streets and roads in Hong Kong

References

External links
 

Roads in Kowloon
Route 1 (Hong Kong)
Yau Ma Tei
Ho Man Tin
Kowloon Tong